Eleonora Anna Giorgi (born 14 September 1989) is an Italian race walker bronze medal at the 2019 World Athletics Championships. She competed at the 2020 Summer Olympics, in 20 km walk.  

She is the 5000 metres race walk (outdoor, track) world record holder with the time of 20:01.80 sets on 18 May 2014 in Misterbianco.

Biography
On 9 June 2012 in A Coruña, one leg of IAAF Race Walking Gran Prix 2012 she obtained the "standard A" for 2012 Summer Olympics, on 13 March at the 2012 IAAF World Race Walking Cup in Saransk (Russia) she ranked 14th, matching the other FIDAL requirement (classify among the first 20 athletes) for FIDAL). On 6 July 2012 she won the race in Bressanone walking 10 km in 45 min 19 sec and received the gold medal.

On 29 September 2019 she won the bronze medal at the first edition of the 50 km race walk at the 2019 World Athletics Championships in Doha, Qatar, race held at night from 11 pm to 3 am the following morning, to try to alleviate the strong heat. She is engaged to the Italian racewalker Matteo Giupponi.

Statistics

World records
 5000 metres race walk (track): 20:01.80 ( Misterbianco, 18 May 2014) – current holder

European records
 50 km walk (road): 4:04:50 ( Alytus, 19 May 2019) – current holder.

Achievements

National titles
Giorgi won seven national championships at individual senior level.
Italian Athletics Championships
10 km (road): 2012, 2019 (2)
20 km (road): 2021 (1)
35 km (road): 2021 (1)
10,000 m (track): 2017 (1)
Italian Indoor Athletics Championships
3000 m race walk: 2012, 2014 (2)

See also
 Italy at the European Race Walking Cup – Multiple medalists
 Italian all-time lists – 20 km walk
 Italian all-time lists – 50 km walk
 List of world records in athletics
 List of European records in athletics
 List of Italian records in athletics
 Italian team at the running events

References

External links

1989 births
Athletes from Milan
Italian female racewalkers
Living people
Athletes (track and field) at the 2012 Summer Olympics
Athletes (track and field) at the 2016 Summer Olympics
Athletes (track and field) at the 2020 Summer Olympics
Olympic athletes of Italy
World Athletics Championships athletes for Italy
World Athletics Championships medalists
Mediterranean Games gold medalists for Italy
Athletes (track and field) at the 2013 Mediterranean Games
World record holders in athletics (track and field)
Mediterranean Games medalists in athletics
Italian Athletics Championships winners
Athletics competitors of Fiamme Azzurre